Cassidulus caribaearum is a species of sea urchins of the family Cassidulidae. Their armour is covered with spines. Cassidulus caribaearum was first scientifically described in 1801 by Jean-Baptiste de Lamarck.

References 

Animals described in 1801
Taxa named by Jean-Baptiste Lamarck
Cassidulidae